Charles Crawford may refer to:

 Charles Crawford (racing driver) (1897–1958), American racecar driver
 Charles Crawford (diplomat) (born 1954), British diplomat
 Charles Crawford (United States Army officer), (1866–1945), United States army officer and author
 Charles B. Crawford (1884–1951), head coach of the University of Virginia college football program, 1910
 Charles H. Crawford (1879–1931), Los Angeles criminal and political figure
 , United States Navy minesweeper and tug in commission from 1917 to 1919
 Charles Crawford (American football) (born 1964), American football running back
 Charles W. Crawford (Royal Navy officer) (1873–1984), British Royal Navy officer and philatelist
 Charles W. Crawford (chemist) (1888–1957), American chemist